Ben Yahia or Benyahia is a name.  People with the name include:

Historic
Bakr Ben Yahia (born 9th century), an important Mozarab figure in Medieval Portugal
Yahia Ben Rabbi (c. 1150–1222), also known as Yahya Ha-Nasi, Yahya Ibn Yaish, Dom Yahia "o Negro", direct descendant of the Exilarchs of Babylon, the eponymous ancestor of the Ibn Yahya family
Yahia Ben Yahi III, also known as Jahia Negro Ibn Ya'isch, a Sephardi Jew also known as Yahya Ha-Nasi, Yahya Ibn Yaish or Dom Yahia "o Negro", the son of Yahia Ben Rabbi

Contemporary
Amor Ben Yahia (born 1985), Tunisian runner
Habib Ben Yahia (born 1938), Tunisian politician
Mohammed Seddik Benyahia (1932–1982), Algerian politician and a militant nationalist during the war in Algeria
Wissem Ben Yahia (born 1984), Tunisian footballer 

Arabic-language surnames